Melekhov, feminine: Melekhova is a Russian-language surname. The Ukrainian-language equivalent is Melekhiv, Belarusan: Melekhau/Melekhaw. 
It is a patronymic surname derived from the diminutive form  Мелёха/Мелеха (Melyokha/Melekha) of the given name Yemelyan]  or Meletiy/Meletius.

Notable people with the surname include:

Aleksandr Melekhov (born 2002), Russian footballer
 (1905-1994) Soviet forestry scientist
 (1945-2012), Soviet and Russian film and stage actor
, Belarusian and Russian film and stage actress
 Melekhov family, from the novel And Quiet Flows the Don novel by Mikhail Sholokhov
, major protagonist of the novel
Prokopy, grandfather of Grigory
Pantelei, father of Grigory
Vasilissa, mother of Grigory
Pyotr, older brother of Grigory
Yevdokiya, younger sister of Grigory
Darya, wife of Pyotr
Natalya, wife of Grigory

See also

References

East Slavic-language surnames
Patronymic surnames